Joseph Elliott was a footballer active in England in the late nineteenth and early twentieth centuries.

A half-back, Elliott made 80 appearances in The Football League for Preston North End between 1989 and 1902, scoring four goals. He then moved to New Brompton of the Southern League, making his debut against Luton Town on 13 September 1902. Over the next four seasons he missed only three league games. During the 1906–07 season he played only occasionally, however, and he left the club in 1907, finishing with a total of 134 Southern League appearances and two goals.

References

Preston North End F.C. players
Gillingham F.C. players
English Football League players
Year of birth missing
Year of death missing
Place of birth missing
Place of death missing
Association football midfielders
English footballers